Carex micrantha is a tussock-forming perennial in the family Cyperaceae. It is native to parts of Asia.

See also
 List of Carex species

References

micrantha
Plants described in 1902
Taxa named by Georg Kükenthal
Flora of Korea
Flora of China